Shovel-nosed snake or shovelnose snake may refer to:

 Brachyurophis, a genus of snakes found in Australia
 Sonora, a genus of snakes found in North America